Yevgeniy Dorokhin is a Russian sprint canoer who competed in the mid-2000s. He won a silver medal in the C-4 200 m event at the 2007 ICF Canoe Sprint World Championships in Duisburg.

References

Living people
Russian male canoeists
Year of birth missing (living people)
ICF Canoe Sprint World Championships medalists in Canadian